The 12781 / 12782 Swarna Jayanti Express is an Express  train belonging to Indian Railways South Western Railway zone that runs between  and  in India. This train is also comes under the Swarna Jayanti Express trains series. It shares its rakes with 22681/22682 Mysore - Chennai Central Weekly Superfast Express

It operates as train number 12781 from Mysore Junction to Hazrat Nizamuddin and as train number 12782  in the reverse direction, serving the states of Karnataka, Maharashtra, Madhya Pradesh, Uttar Pradesh and Delhi.

Coaches
The 12781 / 82 Swarna Jayanti Express & 22681/82 Chennai Superfast Express  has 

 1 AC First Cum AC Two Tier
 2 AC Two Tier
 5 AC Three Tier
 7 Sleeper Class
 1 Pantry Car
 2 General Unreserved
 2 Luggage Cum Disabled Coach
 1 End On Generator Car

As is customary with most train services in India, coach composition may be amended at the discretion of Indian Railways depending on demand.

Service

Routing

Traction

References

External links
12781 Swarna Jayanti Express at India Rail Info
12782 Swarna Jayanti Express at India Rail Info

Swarna Jayanti Express trains
Transport in Mysore
Rail transport in Karnataka
Rail transport in Maharashtra
Rail transport in Madhya Pradesh
Rail transport in Uttar Pradesh
Rail transport in Delhi
Transport in Delhi